Claudiu Micovschi (born 19 June 1999) is a Romanian professional footballer who plays as a midfielder for Italian  club Fidelis Andria, on loan from Avellino.

Club career

Luceafărul Oradea
Born in Diosig, Bihor County, Claudiu Micovschi started his football career at Luceafărul Oradea, a young club in the Romanian football landscape, but focused on raising young players. After excellent results in the youth teams of Luceafărul, Micovschi started to train and be in the senior team entourage since the age of 16, being also convoked to the Romania U-16 team. After a half-year loan at Chievo, Micovschi was sold to Genoa in the summer of 2015.

Chievo
In February 2015, Micovschi was loaned to Chievo, where he played for the youth teams of the club from Verona until the summer of the same year when he returned to Luceafărul.

Genoa
In 2015 Micovschi signed a 3-year contract with Genoa and starting to play for the Primavera team of the club. In November 2015 due to qualities shown in the youth team, Micovschi received as a rewarding a training session with the first squad of the Serie A club. In December 2017 Micovschi became the captain of the Griffin youth team with no less than 8 goals and 2 assists in 14 matches played for the Genovese team.

Loan to Avellino
On 13 August 2019, he was loaned to Serie C club Avellino. He made his senior professional debut on 25 August 2019 in a game against Catania which ended in the 6–3 home loss as he played the whole match. In his third game on 7 September 2019, he scored his first professional goal in a 2–0 victory over Teramo.

Loan to Reggina
On 12 January 2021, Micovschi joined Serie B club Reggina on loan.

Avellino

Loan to Fidelis Andria
On 29 January 2023, Micovschi was loaned by Fidelis Andria.

International career
Claudiu Micovschi played for under-16, under-17, under-18 and under-19 football teams.

References

External links
 
 

1999 births
Living people
People from Diosig
Romanian footballers
Association football midfielders
CS Luceafărul Oradea players
Serie B players
Serie C players
Genoa C.F.C. players
U.S. Avellino 1912 players
Reggina 1914 players
S.S. Fidelis Andria 1928 players
Romanian expatriate footballers
Romanian expatriate sportspeople in Italy
Expatriate footballers in Italy
Romania youth international footballers